Yury Vodovozov (born 19 January 1982) is a retired Belarusian professional footballer.

Career
Vodovozov started his career as a trainee at Dinamo Minsk in 2000, with a loan spell at Naftan Novopolotsk in 2003 followed by a permanent move in 2004 to Lokomotiv-96 Vitebsk. He only stayed there for one season, joining Belarus' top division side Slavia Mozyr in 2005.

Vodovozov played for first division side FC DSK Gomel during the 2009 and 2010 seasons, helping the club reach the semi-finals of the 2009–10 Belarusian Cup.

Honours
Dinamo Minsk
Belarusian Cup winner: 2002–03

References

External links
 

1982 births
Living people
Belarusian footballers
Association football midfielders
FC Dinamo Minsk players
FC Dinamo-Juni Minsk players
FC Naftan Novopolotsk players
FC Vitebsk players
FC Slavia Mozyr players
FC Smorgon players
FC SKVICH Minsk players
FC DSK Gomel players